Castle is one of the ten district electoral areas in Belfast, Northern Ireland. Located in the north of the city, the district elects six members to Belfast City Council and contains the wards of Bellevue, Cavehill, Chichester Park, Duncairn, Fortwilliam and Innisfayle. Castle, along with Oldpark district and parts of the Court district and Newtownabbey Borough Council, forms the Belfast North constituency for the Northern Ireland Assembly and UK Parliament. The district is bounded to the east by the Victoria Channel, to the north by Newtownabbey Borough Council and Belfast Lough, to the south by North Street and to the west by the Cavehill Road.

The district takes its name from the current Belfast Castle, which is located on Cave Hill in the north of the district, while the southern section of the district is part of the city centre and forms one of Belfast's main cultural areas, known as the Cathedral Quarter. The east of the area also contains the Port of Belfast. Castle is served by the M2 and M5 motorways and the Yorkgate railway station.

Castle is one of the most mixed areas in the city, with just over half of the district's population being Protestant at the 2001 Census. There are a number of peace lines in the district, for example along the Whitewell Road.

History
Castle was created for the 1985 local elections. All six wards came from the former Area H, with only the Cliftonville ward and northern section of the Waterworks ward omitted from the new district. One of the district's six wards, Castleview, was renamed Innisfayle in 2014.

Amenities

 Albert Memorial Clock
 Belfast Castle
 Belfast Exposed photographic gallery
 Belfast Harbour
 Belfast Hebrew Congregation
 Belfast Zoo
 Cavehill
 Dividers Sculpture
 Giant's Park
 McHugh's Bar
 Merchant Hotel
 The Northern Whig Bar
 NvTv (Northern Visions Television)
 Obel Tower
 St Anne’s Cathedral (Church of Ireland)
 The Big Fish, sculpture

Sport
 Seaview, Crusaders F.C. home ground
 Skegoneill Avenue, Brantwood F.C. home ground

Education
 Castle High School
 Dominican College
 Hazelwood College
 Seaview Primary School
 St Patrick's College
 University of Ulster, Belfast Campus

Wards

Councillors

See also 
Belfast City Council
Electoral wards of Belfast
Local government in Northern Ireland
Members of Belfast City Council

References

Electoral wards of Belfast
1985 establishments in Northern Ireland